The Barkly River, a perennial river of the West Gippsland catchment, is located in the Alpine region of the Australian state of Victoria.

Location and features
Formed by the confluence of the Barkly River East Branch that drains a state forestry area of the Great Dividing Range from an elevation of    near The Nobs Spur; and the Barkly River West Branch that drains Mount McDonald within the Alpine National Park at an elevation of   , the Barkly River rises in remote country east of the Mount Skene Scenic Reserve, below Mount McKinty. The river flows generally south by east, joined by four minor tributaries, before reaching its confluence with the Macalister River, south of the locale of Glencairn. From its highest elevation including the east and west branches of the river, the Barkly River descends  over its combined  course.

Etymology
The river was named in honour of Sir Henry Barkly, the second Governor of Victoria, serving between 1856 and 1863.

See also

 Rivers of Victoria

References

External links
 
 

West Gippsland catchment
Rivers of Gippsland (region)
Rivers of Hume (region)